Vi lyfter igen is a 2011 Zekes studio album.

Track listing
Vi lyfter igen
En mycket bättre värld
Ett steg i taget
Samma sak
Hold Me
Bullfest
Ingen annan du
Louise
Kalla kårar
Någon att hålla i hand
Se på mig
Om ditt hjärta sa boom

Charts

References 

2011 albums
Zekes albums